Yakov Matveevich Eliashberg (also Yasha Eliashberg; ; born 11 December 1946) is an American mathematician who was born in Leningrad, USSR.

Education and career 

Eliashberg received his PhD, entitled Surgery of Singularities of Smooth Mappings, from Leningrad University in 1972, under the direction of Vladimir Rokhlin.

Due to the growing anti-Semitism in the Soviet Union, from 1972 to 1979 he had to work at the Syktyvkar State University in the isolated Komi Republic. In 1980 Eliashberg returned to Leningrad and applied for a visa, but his request was denied and he became a refusenik until 1987. He was cut off from mathematical life and was prevented to work in academia, but due to a friend's intercession, he managed to secure a job in industry as the head of a computer software group.

In 1988 Eliashberg managed to move to the United States, and since 1989 he has been Herald L. and Caroline L. Ritch professor of mathematics at Stanford University. Between 2001 and 2002 he was Distinguished Visiting Professor at the Institute of Advanced Studies.

Awards
Eliashberg received the "Young Mathematician" Prize from the Leningrad Mathematical Society in 1972. He was an invited speaker at the International Congress of Mathematicians in 1986, 1998 and 2006 (plenary lecture). In 1995 he was a recipient of the Guggenheim Fellowship.

In 2001 Eliashberg was awarded the Oswald Veblen Prize in Geometry from the AMS for his work in symplectic and contact topology, in particular for his proof of the symplectic rigidity and the development of 3-dimensional contact topology.

In 2002 Eliashberg was elected to the National Academy of Sciences of the US and in 2012 he became a fellow of the American Mathematical Society. He also was a member of the Selection Committee in mathematical sciences of the Shaw Prize. He received a Doctorat Honoris Causa from the ENS Lyon in 2009 and from the University of Uppsala in 2017.

In 2013 Eliashberg shared with Helmut Hofer the Heinz Hopf Prize from the ETH, Zurich, for their pioneering research in symplectic topology. In 2016 Yakov Eliashberg was awarded the Crafoord Prize in Mathematics from the Swedish Academy of Sciences for the development of contact and symplectic topology and groundbreaking discoveries of rigidity and flexibility phenomena.

In 2020 he received the Wolf Prize in Mathematics (jointly with Simon K. Donaldson). He was elected to the American Academy of Arts and Sciences in 2021.

Research 
Eliashberg's research interests are in differential topology, especially in symplectic and contact topology.

In the 80's he developed a combinatorial technique which he used to prove that the group of symplectomorphisms is -closed in the diffeomorphism group. This fundamental result, proved in a different way also by Gromov is now called the Eliashberg-Gromov theorem, and is one of the first manifestation of symplectic rigidity.

In 1990 he discovered a complete topological characterization of Stein manifolds of complex dimension greater than 2.

Eliashberg classified contact structures into "tight" and "overtwisted" ones. Using this dichotomy, he gave the complete classification of contact structures on the 3-sphere. Together with Thurston, he developed the theory of confoliations, which unifies foliations and contact structures.

Eliashberg worked on various aspects of the h-principle, introduced by Mikhail Gromov, and he wrote in 2002 an introductory book on the subject.

Together with Givental and Hofer, Eliashberg pioneered the foundations of symplectic field theory.

He supervised 41 PhD students as of 2022.

Major publications

Books
 Eliashberg, Yakov M.; Thurston, William P. Confoliations. University Lecture Series, 13. American Mathematical Society, Providence, RI, 1998. x+66 pp. 
 Eliashberg, Y.; Mishachev, N. Introduction to the h-principle. Graduate Studies in Mathematics, 48. American Mathematical Society, Providence, RI, 2002. xviii+206 pp. 
 Cieliebak, Kai; Eliashberg, Yakov. From Stein to Weinstein and back. Symplectic geometry of affine complex manifolds. American Mathematical Society Colloquium Publications, 59. American Mathematical Society, Providence, RI, 2012. xii+364 pp.

References

1946 births
Living people
Mathematicians from Saint Petersburg
Jewish Russian scientists
Saint Petersburg State University alumni
Members of the United States National Academy of Sciences
Fellows of the American Academy of Arts and Sciences
Fellows of the American Mathematical Society
Topologists
Stanford University Department of Mathematics faculty